The ARIA Music Award for Best Group, is an award presented at the annual ARIA Music Awards, which recognises "the many achievements of Aussie artists across all music genres", since 1987. It is handed out by the Australian Recording Industry Association (ARIA), an organisation whose aim is "to advance the interests of the Australian record industry." The award is given to an Australian group comprising two or more members for an album or single release. The accolade is voted for by a judging academy which comprises 1000 members from different areas of the music industry.

The award for Best Group was first presented to INXS in 1987, for their single "Listen Like Thieves".

Winners and nominees
In the following table, the winner is highlighted in a separate colour, and in boldface; the nominees are those that are not highlighted or in boldface. All reliable sources used in this article make no mention of nominees from 1989 - 1991. 1987 information is based on an ARIA-supplied video.

Notes

References

External links
The ARIA Awards Official website

G